Fateh Singh (born 20 April 2004) is an English cricketer. He made his List A debut on 6 August 2021, for Nottinghamshire in the 2021 Royal London One-Day Cup. In December 2021, he was named in England's team for the 2022 ICC Under-19 Cricket World Cup in the West Indies.

References

External links
 

2004 births
Living people
English cricketers
Nottinghamshire cricketers
Cricketers from Nottingham
People educated at Trent College
British Asian cricketers
British sportspeople of Indian descent